Oroplexia is a genus of moths of the family Noctuidae.

Species
 Oroplexia albiflexura (Walker, 1857)
 Oroplexia decorata (Moore, 1882)
 Oroplexia luteifrons (Walker, 1857)
 Oroplexia retrahens (Walker, 1857)
 Oroplexia separata (Moore, 1882)
 Oroplexia simulata (Moore, 1881)
 Oroplexia tripartita (Leech, 1900)

References
Natural History Museum Lepidoptera genus database
Oroplexia at funet

Hadeninae